Dactylosporangium solaniradicis is a bacterium from the genus Dactylosporangium which has been isolated from roots of the tomato plant Solanum lycopersicum from a farm in Xiangfang, China.

References

 

Micromonosporaceae
Bacteria described in 2016